The Aita (in its upper course also: Jemenc) is a right tributary of the river Olt in Romania. It discharges into the Olt in Aita Mare.

Tributaries

The following rivers are tributaries to the river Aita (from source to mouth):

Left: Pârâul lui Matis, Tecșe, Cocoș, Valea Mică
Right: Valea Mare, Ulmul, Cenek, Pârâul Lung, Groapa Pietroasă

References

Rivers of Romania
Rivers of Covasna County